Brian Armstrong is a former New Zealand association football player who represented New Zealand.

Armstrong made his full All Whites debut in a 5–1 win over Fiji on 17 February 1973 and he ended his international playing career with 9 A-international caps to his credit, his final cap being a substitute appearance in a 1–1 draw with Australia on 4 March 1975.

Armstrong family

Armstrong's family is well represented in international football. His father Ken Armstrong was a dual international representing both England and New Zealand, his brother Ron Armstrong also represented New Zealand while niece Bridgette Armstrong represented New Zealand at senior level and at the 2008 FIFA U-17 and FIFA U-20 Women's World Cups.

References

External links

Living people
New Zealand association footballers
New Zealand international footballers
Association football midfielders
Year of birth missing (living people)
Brian
1973 Oceania Cup players